Admiral  Sir William Montagu Dowell  (2 August 1825 – 27 December 1912) was a Royal Navy officer who served as Commander-in-Chief, Devonport.

Naval career
Dowell joined the Royal Navy in 1839. He served in the Black Sea during the Crimean War. He was given command of HMS Hornet and HMS Barrosa and, in the latter ship, took part in the Bombardment of Shimonoseki in 1863. Later he commanded HMS Euryalus, HMS Topaze and then HMS Leander. He was made Commander-in-Chief, Cape of Good Hope and West Coast of Africa Station in 1867 before taking command of HMS Hercules in 1871.

He became Second-in-Command of the Channel Squadron in 1877, Senior Officer, Coast of Ireland Station in 1878, Senior Officer in Command of the Channel Squadron in 1882, Commander-in-Chief, China Station in 1884 and Commander-in-Chief, Devonport in 1888. He retired in 1890.

In retirement he became President of the Royal British Female Orphan Asylum in Plymouth.

Family
In 1855 he married Caroline Johnna Pike.

References

|-

|-

|-

|-

1825 births
1912 deaths
Royal Navy admirals
Knights Grand Cross of the Order of the Bath